The Efimov effect is an effect in the quantum mechanics of few-body systems predicted by the Russian theoretical physicist V. N. Efimov in 1970. Efimov’s effect is where three identical bosons interact, with the prediction of an infinite series of excited three-body energy levels when a two-body state is exactly at the dissociation threshold. One corollary is that there exist bound states (called Efimov states) of three bosons even if the two-particle attraction is too weak to allow two bosons to form a pair. A (three-particle) Efimov state, where the (two-body) sub-systems are unbound, is often depicted symbolically by the Borromean rings. This means that if one of the particles is removed, the remaining two fall apart. In this case, the Efimov state is also called a Borromean state.

Theory 

Efimov predicted that, as the pair interactions among three identical bosons approach resonance—that is, as the binding energy of some two-body bound state approaches zero or the scattering length of such a state becomes infinite—the three-body spectrum exhibits an infinite sequence of bound states  whose scattering lengths  and binding energies  each form a geometric progression

where the common ratio

is a universal constant (OEIS ). Here 

is the order of the imaginary-order modified Bessel function of the second kind  that describes the radial dependence of the wavefunction. By virtue of the resonance-determined boundary conditions, it is the unique positive value of  satisfying the transcendental equation
.

Experimental results 
In 2005, for the first time the research group of Rudolf Grimm and Hanns-Christoph Nägerl from the Institute for Experimental Physics at the University of Innsbruck experimentally confirmed such a state in an ultracold gas of caesium atoms. In 2006, they published their findings in the scientific journal Nature.
Further experimental proof for the existence of the Efimov state has been given recently by independent groups. Almost 40 years after Efimov's purely theoretical prediction, the characteristic periodic behavior of the states has been confirmed.

The most accurate experimental value of the scaling factor of the states has been determined by the experimental group of Rudolf Grimm at Innsbruck University as 21.0(1.3), being very close to Efimov's original prediction.

The interest in the "universal phenomena" of cold atomic gases is still growing, especially because of the long-awaited experimental results. The discipline of universality in cold atomic gases near the Efimov states is sometimes referred to as "Efimov physics".

In 2014, the experimental group of Cheng Chin of the University of Chicago and the group of Matthias Weidemüller of the University of Heidelberg have observed Efimov states in an ultracold mixture of lithium and caesium atoms, which extends Efimov's original picture of three identical bosons.

An Efimov state existing as an excited state of a helium trimer was observed in an experiment in 2015.

Usage 
The Efimov states are independent of the underlying physical interaction and can in principle be observed in all quantum mechanical systems (i.e. molecular, atomic, and nuclear).
The states are very special because of their "non-classical" nature: The size of each three-particle Efimov state is much larger than the force-range between the individual particle pairs. This means that the state is purely quantum mechanical. Similar phenomena are observed in two-neutron halo-nuclei, such as lithium-11; these are called Borromean nuclei. (Halo nuclei could be seen as special Efimov states, depending on the subtle definitions.)

See also 

 Three-body force

References

External links
 Press release about the experimental confirmation (2006.03.16)
 Overwhelming proof for Efimov State that's become a hotbed for research some 40 years after it first appeared (2009.12.14)
 Observation of the Second Triatomic Resonance in Efimov’s Scenario (2014.05.15)

Quantum mechanics